Tardisodes are mini-episodes of the television programme Doctor Who, created to accompany the 2006 series of the programme. Made by Doctor Who producers BBC Wales, each Tardisode is approximately 60 seconds long and serves as an introduction to one of the actual 45-minute episodes. They were available on the BBC Doctor Who website free of charge, and on mobile phones by subscription. They were produced as an effort by the BBC to expand the reach of Doctor Who beyond the television series, and include footage not seen on television, and some back-story for the following episode. Their name is a portmanteau of the words TARDIS and "episode".

The first Tardisode, a prequel to "New Earth", was released by the BBC on 1 April 2006; it was promoted in the accompanying children's series Totally Doctor Who. New Tardisodes were released a week before each episode aired, directly after a new episode had finished airing on BBC 1. They were created by the same team that produced the interactive Doctor Who episode Attack of the Graske in 2005.

The Tardisodes were advertised on BBC 1. In the advert, the TARDIS is shown to be on an ice sheet. This imagery is similar to that used in the background of the homepage of the official Doctor Who website in the run-up to the start of Series 2. This advert was shown immediately after the transmission of many Series 2 episodes, coinciding with the release of the latest Tardisode for the next week's episode online and to mobile phones.

Downloads of the Tardisodes to mobile telephones were less popular than expected: around 40,000 downloads, averaging 3,000 per episode. Downloads to personal computers were much more common, with 2.6 million downloads. Iain Tweedale, new media editor for BBC Wales, suggested two reasons for the low number of telephone downloads: although the BBC provided the episodes free, most users had to pay a fee to their mobile network, and many telephones were not compatible with the broadcasts.

DVD producers 2|entertain did not include the Tardisodes on the series 2 DVD release.

In 2007, the BBC's annual report said of the Tardisodes that they "were not the hit we expected although they were popular on broadband", and this may be why they were discontinued after series 2.

No Tardisodes were produced for later series, although a similar series of prequels were released on the Doctor Who website to accompany selected episodes starting with series 6.

Synopses

Tardisode 1 – "New Earth" 

The viewer is introduced to New Earth, and the feline nurses who claim that they can cure anyone of any disease. A patient with terminal Autrey syndrome instantly regains her full health. Suddenly the lights go out and a patient screams for help...

Tardisode 2 – "Tooth and Claw" 

An object from space crashes into the Earth with a large explosion. Three hundred years later, a crofter (Alan Doorington) walks through a grassland. Suddenly, something in the grass starts chasing him. The man quickens his speed, and turns round just in time to see a werewolf jump at him...

Tardisode 3 – "School Reunion" 
 
Mickey is at a computer, looking at a website of UFO sightings, but is then blocked by a notice referring to Torchwood. He picks up his phone and calls Rose while sorting through newspaper clippings, telling her that he needs her and the Doctor to investigate lights in the sky and strange goings on at a school. The Tardisode ends with a shot of a Krillitane screaming into the camera. Unlike most other Tardisodes, the main episode makes dialogue reference to the events of the prequel.

Tardisode 4 – "The Girl in the Fireplace" 

Two pilots are at the controls of an unidentified spaceship. Suddenly, an ion storm hits the ship, causing chaos as lights start flashing and things start exploding, with the two pilots desperately trying to regain control. One of them shouts "Mayday!" as the scene blacks out. Later, the same cockpit is now bathed in a red light and both of the pilots are on the floor, one presumably dead. An eerie tick-tock noise is heard. A shadow falls over the surviving pilot, who is at first relieved to see help. Her relief soon turns to terror, as she suddenly becomes scared of whatever is looming over her, and she screams. A clock face cracks – part of a clock situated on top of a fireplace...

Tardisode 5 – "Rise of the Cybermen" 

A mission briefing from Gemini calls all Preacher agents into action, describing Cybus Industries, how thousands of people have gone missing, John Lumic, the head of Cybus Industries, and his latest "upgrade" – the Cybermen. The briefing ends, and the laptop it was playing on is closed by Ricky Smith (Mickey's counterpart on the parallel Earth), who drives away in a van, just as an advertisement for Cybus Industries is heard on the radio, announcing: "Coming soon, the ultimate upgrade"...

Tardisode 6 – "The Age of Steel" 

A video from John Lumic orders the "upgrade" of humans to Cybermen to commence around the world. This is followed by an animated diagram of a "Skin to Metal Upgrade" and a Cyberman being instructed by Lumic to "delete" all incompatible humans...

Tardisode 7 – "The Idiot's Lantern" 

Grandma Conolly has her new television installed. Later, the woman sits down in front of it, and strange red lightning reaches out from the television towards her. As she looks back at the screen, the lightning retracts back into the set and dances on the screen. The Grandma presumes that the set is broken, so she proceeds to hit it with her hands. The lightning shoots towards her face and she shouts for help. The television then shows a trailer for the upcoming coronation of Queen Elizabeth II...

Tardisode 8 – "The Impossible Planet" 

A woman in a suit tells a man, Captain Walker, about a black hole called "K37 Jem 5" which is orbited by a planet. The woman asks him to bring back the power source that is keeping the planet in orbit and become the "man who saved the Empire." When asked by Walker about how she found out about it, the woman produces a small book containing alien writing and what appears to be a map. The woman informs him it was found in the "Galis Expedition". Walker then passes the notebook to someone standing behind him. It appears the location Walker needs to go to is on the other side of the galaxy, and the woman informs him that all they have to go on is the map and "local myths", but reassures him that it's superstition, and Walker will have a "top class" ship and crew. Finally the woman wishes Walker luck, and Walker leaves, passing the person to whom he handed the notebook, an Ood, who simply says "And the Beast shall rise from the pit."

Tardisode 9 – "The Satan Pit" 

An Ood delivers a metal case to a man, telling him that the contents are Captain Walker's belongings. The man tells the Ood to leave and then opens the case. As he does so, the lights go out and the ship's computer states "He shall awake." The man then takes out the notebook and as he thumbs through the pages, the book emits a red light, and the monitors in the room begin to flicker and display the message "THE BEAST IS AWAKE. HE SHALL RISE FROM THE PIT." Then, a lever depresses on its own, and the notebook suddenly bursts into flames in the man's hands. He runs to the door in fear but the doors will not open, the computer telling him that the door is sealed, followed by a repeated chant of "He is coming. He is coming". Later, a woman enters the room, claiming to smell burning. She finds the man cowering in a chair, silently muttering, with the mysterious writing from the notebook having somehow transferred to his face...

Tardisode 10 – "Love & Monsters" 

A mysterious figure, presumably Victor Kennedy, is using a laptop to access a website titled L.I.N.D.A, which shows a hand drawn sketch of the Doctor with the text "Who Is The Doctor?" followed by "Have You Seen Him?". The user clicks on the "Join L.I.N.D.A." button, causing the picture to change to a sketch of several people in a room, with the caption: "WE HAVE!". Text appears that reads "Last Updated – WHOOPS! Ages ago, sorry – ELTON". The user clicks again on "Join L.I.N.D.A.", which this time makes the screen display the following text: "But L.I.N.D.A. is a secret organisation. So we can't tell you where... If you need us...You'll find us." The user points a strange silver object at the laptop, which changes the display to read "PRIMITIVE COMPUTER PAGE". The screen then displays a map, with text saying "TRACK SOURCE". The map closes in on a location called "MACATEER ST", before the screen goes blank. An old lady enters the room, carrying a tray, and as she turns around, her expression turns to horror, and she is bathed in a green light. The heavy breathing of the unseen figure turns into a slurping and growling (suggesting that Kennedy has morphed into the Abzorbaloff), and the old lady shouts "No!"...

Tardisode 11 – "Fear Her" 

This Tardisode appears to be in the style of a fictional Crimewatch-style program called Crime Crackers. The presenter is on a London street, as he tells the viewers that a young boy called Dale Hicks and a young girl called Jane McEllen have gone missing, with the police having no idea where they are, followed by an encouragement from the presenter for the viewers to phone in and give information (to a 19-digit telephone number), at the same time revealing the road to be "Dame Kelly Holmes Close" (and the local authority to be "East London Council"). The scene then changes to a cupboard in a dark room, which suddenly bangs open to reveal a pair of red glowing eyes. A voice rasps "I'm coming..."

Tardisode 12 – "Army of Ghosts" 

A reporter tells his Editor about the story so big, he thinks it will be the story of the century – the story of Torchwood. His editor asks him to get the story for her, and so the reporter is shown passing secret envelopes, looking through files and photos, several of which feature the Doctor. The reporter is sure that Torchwood goes back as far as "Queen Victoria, right up to the explosion on Christmas Day and is connected with the Ghosts that have been appearing lately". He then returns to his Editor with his findings, only to be told that there have been "complications", and is dragged off by several mysterious men. Meanwhile, another man talks to the Editor, and says that Torchwood thanks her for her co-operation, before leaving her with a replacement front-page story about GCSE results. The reporter is last seen in a straitjacket, protesting as he is hauled away: "I'm not mad! Torchwood exists! I know the truth about the Ghosts!"...

Tardisode 13 – "Doomsday" 

The Tardisode is in the form of an emergency news broadcast. A female news reporter informs the viewer that the country is in a State of Emergency. The Tardisode then cuts to amateur-style footage of the Cyberman invasion, with cars exploding, people running and screaming and other scenes of destruction and terror. We return to the newsroom, and the reporter behind the desk informs us that they have lost contact with the government, and if anyone is still watching to run as fast as they can. The graphic behind her changes to the footage from earlier, and the transmission is met with interference, and the studio begins exploding around her. The reporter also addresses her own parents to flee from the Cybermen. Finally, she cowers under her desk as we hear the unmistakable sound of Daleks enter the room, proclaiming "We are the Masters of Earth." "Daleks conquer and destroy!" finally ending the Tardisode with a Dalek yelling "Exterminate!", who said it before killing the female news reporter.

Continuity
 In an interview with Noel Clarke for Totally Doctor Who, he revealed that his hair was noticeably shorter during the filming of Tardisode 3 than in the episode it accompanied, "School Reunion". For this reason, to maintain continuity, he wears a hat for the duration of the Tardisode.
 Images of the Doctor are shown in two of the shorts. In Tardisode 10 a drawing of him is seen on a computer; in Tardisode 12 he appears in drawings and in an antique photograph.
 Tardisode 12 references "Tooth and Claw" and "The Christmas Invasion".

Production
 Before a Tardisode, the time vortex is briefly seen. If the main episode is set in the past, the vortex is blue and if the main episode is set in the present or future, the vortex is red.
 A new set was built for Tardisode 4.
 Tardisode 8 was filmed entirely in the BBC Wales Canteen.
 As of 2019, there is no "East London Council" as seen in 2012 in Tardisode 11

See also

 Webisode

References

External links
 
 Announcement of Tardisodes
 

2006 web series debuts
2006 web series endings
Webcasts based on Doctor Who
Mobile telephone video series
Science fiction web series
Doctor Who spin-offs
Films with screenplays by Gareth Roberts (writer)
Doctor Who mini-episodes